Prudencio Norales Martínez (born 20 April 1956) is a retired Honduran football midfielder who played for Honduras in the 1982 FIFA World Cup.

Club career
Nicknamed Tecate, Norales also played for Olimpia. He is one of the few players who scored four goals in a Honduran league game, against Atlético Portuario in October 1979. He scored 88 goals in total in the Honduran League and scored the 500th league goal in Olimpia's history on 22 July 1979, also against Atlético Portuario.

International career
Norales played at the 1977 FIFA World Youth Championship, where he scored the winning goal in their first game against Morocco.

Norales represented Honduras in 5 FIFA World Cup qualification matches and played in 2 games at the 1982 FIFA World Cup.

References

External links

1956 births
Living people
Association football midfielders
Honduran footballers
Honduras international footballers
1982 FIFA World Cup players
C.D. Olimpia players